Deutsche Umwelthilfe e.V. (DUH, using the English name Environmental Action Germany) is a non-profit environmental and consumer protection association, supported by public and private project grants and donations. It is a member of the European Environmental Bureau, in Brussels. It has the legal right to represent group claims in court against projects that it considers a threat to the environment. The group also aims to provide a forum for dialogue between environmental organizations, politicians and business people.

Notable work
In 2017, DUH filed a suit against Germany’s Federal Motor Transport Authority (KBA), accusing it of failing to act robustly enough over Volkswagen's diesel emissions scandal.

In 2023, DUH lodged a complaint calling for the operating licence of the Floating Storage and Regasification Unit (FSRU) ship Höegh Esperanza at Wilhelmshaven LNG terminal to be shortened by a decade citing its discharging of chlorine and risks to Germany's climate targets.

Political pressure
At its party congress on 8 December 2018, Germans conservative party CDU decided to have the non-profit status of the DUH examined. The motion was tabled by Steffen Bilger, a member of Bundestag for CDU, who is also Parliamentary Under-Secretary of State in the Federal Ministry of Transport, as chairman of the CDU district association Nordwuerttemberg. The CDU also wants to ensure that the association no longer receives funds from the federal budget. The Federal Ministry for the Environment and the Federal Ministry of Economics subsequently declared that they would continue to promote the DUH. The responsible tax office in Singen stressed that it could only take action if there were concrete indications. In the ARD magazine Monitor, the lawyer Joachim Wieland commented on Bilger's stance against the DUH that the policy had long watched in connection with the violations of emission values and did not intervene out of consideration for the automotive industry. Now they are trying to steer the resulting anger away from politics and the automotive industry, towards the courts and the Environmental Action Germany.

Critics
In March 2017, local newspaper Frankfurter Allgemeine Zeitung criticized the organization, calling it "an interest group financing by Cease and desist (Abmahnungen)“.

References

External links 
  

Organizations established in 1975
Nature conservation organisations based in Germany
Environmental organisations based in Germany
Deutscher Naturschutzring